Atep Ahmad Rizal (born 5 June 1985 in Cianjur, West Java, Indonesia), simply known as Atep, is an Indonesian professional footballer who plays as a winger for Liga 3 club Persika 1951.

Club career

Persija Jakarta 
In 2004, Atep was signed by Persija Jakarta after a fairly good season with Persiba Bantul. It does not take long for him to get a place in the first team. His remarkable achievements with Persija opened wide opportunities for his international career. In 2005, he was called up to the Indonesian national team in the AFF Cup and scored once. His excellent performance at Persija attracted many clubs to sign him, including Persib Bandung who were in talks of bringing him in for the 2008 season. He stayed at Persija until the end of the 2007 season.

Persib Bandung 
In 2008, Persib Bandung finally managed to sign Atep, after failing to get it in the previous season. Although his arrival was greeted so positively by Bobotoh, he did not get so many chances to play early in the season so many predicted that he would leave in the transfer season at the break of the competition. But he survived and his end began to get a chance to play even though only as a backup player. On 6 May 2009, he scored his first league goal in a 2–1 defeat to Pelita Jaya. the In 2014 season Atep became a hero for Persib after scoring a spectacular goal against Arema Cronus that sent Persib to the final against Persipura. The following season's league start was postponed, which cleared the way for Persib to compete in the AFC Cup before the league began. There, Atep scored in every match they played.

Atep left Persib at the end of the 2018 Liga 1, after playing for the club for 10 years.

Mitra Kukar 
Upon his release from Persib at the end of the 2018 season, Atep joined recently-relegated side Mitra Kukar.

PSKC and Muba Babel 
In 2020, Atep signed for PSKC Cimahi. After the 2020 season was declared void, he transferred to Muba Babel United the following year and made his league debut on 6 October in an away match against Sriwijaya.

Style of play 
Atep was known for his dribbling abilities and his influences on the pitch that made him Persib captain in many occasions before passing the captaincy to Supardi Nasir in 2018. He is regarded as an icon for Bobotoh or the supporters of Persib, with the nickname "Lord Atep". When he scored, Bobotoh performed push-ups as an appreciation mark.

International career

International goals

Honours
Persib U-21
Soeratin Cup
PSSI U-20 Championship: Runner-up 2003

Persib Bandung
Indonesia Super League: 2014
Piala Presiden: 2015

Filmography 
 Hari Ini Pasti Menang (2013)

References

External links 
  Profil Atep
 Atep on soccerway

Indonesian footballers
1985 births
Living people
People from Cianjur
Indonesia international footballers
2007 AFC Asian Cup players
Association football wingers
Sundanese people
Liga 1 (Indonesia) players
Persija Jakarta players
Persiba Bantul players
Persib Bandung players
Indonesian Super League-winning players